The Madrasah-i Rahimiyah  is an Islamic seminary located in Delhi, India. It was founded by Shah Abdur Rahim, the father of Shah Waliullah Dehlawi, during the reign of Mughal Emperor Aurangzeb. After the death of Shah Abdur Rahim in 1718 Shah Waliullah started teaching at the Madrasah. It became a leading institute of Islamic learning and was acknowledged as the most influential seminary in the Indian subcontinent. Later, when Shah Wali Ullah died, his sons Shah Abdul Aziz, Shah Rafi and Shah Abdul Qader began teaching here, with Abdul Aziz becoming its principal. Following the death of Abdul Aziz, the leadership of the Madrasah passed on to his grandson Shah Muhammad Ishaq. Following Muhammad Ishaq's death in 1846, the Madrasah broke up into a number of interlinked schools.

See also
Darul Uloom Deoband
Syed Ahmad Barelvi
Al Jamiatul Ashrafia
Al-Jame-atul-Islamia

References

Madrasas in India
Islam in India